Jeffrey Hull (born 25 August 1960 in Rochford, England) is an English former professional footballer who played as a midfielder for football league clubs Southend United and Essex rivals Colchester United. He retired from the professional game in 1985 through injury.

References

External links
 
 Jeff Hull at Colchester United Archive Database

1960 births
English footballers
People from Rochford
Colchester United F.C. players
Southend United F.C. players
Basildon United F.C. players
Living people
Association football midfielders